Sheri Benson (born 1962 or 1963) is a Canadian politician who represented the riding of Saskatoon West in the House of Commons of Canada from the 2015 election until her defeat in 2019. She is a member of the New Democratic Party (NDP). Prior to her election, she was the CEO of the local United Way and also served as a justice of the peace.

Early life 

Benson lived in Brandon and Winnipeg during her early childhood, where she also participated in Girl Guides of Canada programs as a Brownie and Guide. As a member of Girl Guides, Benson earned a fire safety badge for which she was presented a certificate of achievement by Howard Pawley, and often went by the nickname "Safety Sher".

Background and prior community involvement

As CEO for the local United Way, since 2009, Benson worked with community, labour, and business groups to launch Saskatoon's first-ever Plan to End Homelessness and Saskatoon's Housing First Program. Benson also implemented the organization's ground-breaking Aboriginal Engagement Strategy.

Under Benson's leadership, United Way support for community programs grew 60%—to nearly $5-million in 2014.

Benson was the inaugural Justice of the Peace for Saskatchewan's Victims of Domestic Violence Act. In 2014, Benson received a YWCA Woman of Distinction Award for Community Building.

To further strengthen community services, she co-founded the Saskatoon Collaborative Funding Partnership and has co-chaired the Saskatoon Regional Intersectoral Committee.

Politics
Benson was elected in the 2015 federal election representing Saskatoon West.

Benson was appointed as Deputy Leader of the NDP serving with Alexandre Boulerice on March 14, 2019 by party leader Jagmeet Singh. She also served as the NDP critic for Housing in the 42nd Canadian Parliament.

She was one of five out LGBT people serving in the 42nd Canadian Parliament, alongside Rob Oliphant, Seamus O'Regan, Randall Garrison and Randy Boissonnault. Benson was the first out LGBT politician in Saskatchewan to be elected to the House of Commons.

She was defeated by Conservative Brad Redekopp in the 2019 federal election.

Electoral record

References

Living people
New Democratic Party MPs
Members of the House of Commons of Canada from Saskatchewan
Politicians from Brandon, Manitoba
Politicians from Saskatoon
Women members of the House of Commons of Canada
Canadian LGBT Members of Parliament
Lesbian politicians
United Ways people
Women in Saskatchewan politics
Canadian justices of the peace
21st-century Canadian politicians
21st-century Canadian women politicians
1960s births
21st-century Canadian LGBT people